Ishk Ishk Ishk is a Hindi film produced, directed by and starring Dev Anand along with Zeenat Aman, Kabir Bedi, and Shabana Azmi. The film has some beautiful scenes of mountains in Nepal and Kalimpong. We can see Dr.Graham’s Homes school which was called Kalimpong Public School in the movie.

Plot
The film begins with the beautiful scenes of Nepal. 
The child version of Dhun (Dev Anand)is a student of a music school run by (AK Hangal), where he makes a friend (Kabir Bedi). Dhun grows up to become a talented music teacher who his students love. Dhun is in love with Pammy (Shabana Azami), but she comes under the influence of her father and denies the love of Dhun. Dhun broken hearted leaves the school job and decides to go to the Math (a highest mountain in Nepal). He comes upon an Inn called Six Sisters Inn, run by Pahar (Premnath). He decides to stay there for a while. He meets the sisters, and falls in love with the one named Pooja (Zeenat Aman). In one of the incidents, Pooja slips from a cliff and Dhun saves her amidst an avalanche and snow storm. Pooja falls in love with Dhun, and both hope to marry soon. Pahar does raise objections, but they soon are overcome. Just when the marriage is being planned, the family come to know that both Pooja and Dhun are related, and the relationship is that Dhun is Pooja's maternal uncle. But the film ends with a surprising climax.

Cast
Dev Anand as Dhuun/Ravi Vyas
Zeenat Aman as Pooja Pahar
Shabana Azmi as Pammy
Kabir Bedi as Diwana/Ravikant Vyas
Shekhar Kapur
Zarina Wahab as Prema
Prem Nath as Pahar
Trilok Kapoor as Col. S. K. Kumar
Satyajeet as Gambhir
Jeevan as Ghanshyam Dayal
Iftekhar as Ghimire
A. K. Hangal as Guruji
Komilla Wirk as Jassi Pahar
Nadira

Crew
Director – Dev Anand
Producer – Dev Anand
Executive Producer – Amit Khanna
Cinematographer – Fali Mistry
Audiography – Arun Sharma
Music Director – R. D. Burman
Lyricist – Anand Bakshi
Playback Singers – Asha Bhosle, Kishore Kumar, Sushma Shrestha

Music

Notes
During the making of this movie, Dev Anand surveyed the location from a helicopter in Nepal. It also involved the thrilling experience of trekking and sleeping in tents. A perfectionist to the core, Dev Saab identified Shyangboche, with hardly any habitation and decided to have his shooting in the hilly areas of Nepal.
Dev Saab claims, “If you ever happen to see ‘Ishq, Ishq, Ishq’, look out for that shot of Mount Everest with a sweetheart of a cloud spinning around it, a very rare sight indeed!”

Reception
Despite the famous tracks, which were composed by no other than R. D. Burman and the expensive budget for the film, the film was received as the "biggest disaster" for Dev Saab and his crew.

References

External links

1974 films
1970s Hindi-language films
Films directed by Dev Anand
Films scored by R. D. Burman
Films set in Nepal
Films shot in Kathmandu
Films shot in Nepal
Avalanches in film